Florence Blatrix-Contat (born 30 March 1966) is a French politician from the Socialist Party. She was elected Senator for Ain on 27 September 2020.

References 

1966 births
Living people
French Senators of the Fifth Republic
Socialist Party (France) politicians
Senators of Ain
21st-century French women politicians
Place of birth missing (living people)
Women members of the Senate (France)